K.V.Kuppam block  is a revenue block and Taluk of Vellore district of the Indian state of Tamil Nadu. This revenue block consists 39 panchayat villages.

References 

Revenue blocks of Vellore district